The 2018 Punta Open was a professional tennis tournament played on clay courts. It was the first edition of the tournament which was part of the 2018 ATP Challenger Tour. It took place in Punta del Este, Uruguay between 26 February and 4 March 2018.

Singles main-draw entrants

Seeds

 1 Rankings are as of 19 February 2018.

Other entrants
The following players received wildcards into the singles main draw:
  Daniel Gimeno Traver
  Patricio Heras
  Santiago Maresca
  Nicolás Xiviller

The following players received entry from the qualifying draw:
  Juan Ignacio Galarza
  Carlos Gómez-Herrera
  Juan Ignacio Londero
  Gian Marco Moroni

Champions

Singles

 Guido Andreozzi def.  Simone Bolelli 3–6, 6–4, 6–3.

Doubles

 Facundo Bagnis /  Ariel Behar def.  Simone Bolelli /  Alessandro Giannessi 6–2, 7–6(9–7).

References

2018 ATP Challenger Tour
Punta Open
2018 in Uruguayan tennis